Justin Sherman (born 26 January 1987) is an Australian rules footballer who played for the Brisbane Lions and Western Bulldogs in the Australian Football League (AFL).

He was recruited as the number 45 draft pick in the 2004 AFL draft from Clarence. He made his debut for the Brisbane Lions in round 4, 2005 against .

In only his second season of AFL football, Sherman was voted runner-up in the Brisbane Lions best and fairest award.

Sherman played primarily as a midfielder, but could also play in the forward pocket and short deep half-forward and half backline. In October 2010, he was traded to the Western Bulldogs.

In June 2011, he was involved in a racial vilification incident during a match against . A Western Bulldogs media release said he had apologised to the other player and that his apology has been accepted. The club suspended him for four weeks and contributed $5,000 to a charity, take part in the club's multicultural and community programs and volunteer for the Red Dust Role Models program which provided mentoring and support in remote indigenous communities.

As of 2018, Sherman is Captain / Coach of Laurimar Football Club in the Northern Football Netball League.

References

External links

 Justin Sherman at the Brisbane Lions website 
 

1987 births
Living people
Australian rules footballers from Tasmania
Brisbane Lions players
Western Bulldogs players
Clarence Football Club players
Williamstown Football Club players
Australia international rules football team players